| tries               = {{#expr: 

+3  +7  +11 +8  +8 +9   +3 +9   +4 +9   +6 +6   +3 +6   +7 +5 
+2  +7  +9 +14  +7 +4   +6 +4   +4 +5   +10 +9  +4 +13  +3 +7
+5  +6  +9 +11  +3 +2   +1 +5   +2 +7   +3 +5   +7 +4   +12 +2
+6  +5  +7 +14  +5 +4   +4 +15  +5 +8   +5 +3   +0 +9   +6 +8
+3  +3  +7 +3   +3 +7   +7 +1   +2 +6   +1 +7   +3 +3   +4 +6
+11 +8  +7 +10  +3 +2   +4 +6   +7 +10  +5 +8   +2 +8   +5 +6
+13 +4  +6  +2  +1 +4   +4   
}}
| top point scorer    = (88 points)
| top try scorer      = (8 tries)
| venue               = Kingston Park
| attendance2         = 3,838
| champions           =  Leinster A
| count               = 1
| runner-up           =  Newcastle Falcons
| website             = 
| previous year       = 2011–12
| previous tournament = 2011–12 British and Irish Cup
| next year           = 2013–14
| next tournament     = 2013–14 British and Irish Cup
}}

The 2012–13 British and Irish Cup was the fourth season of the annual rugby union competition for second tier, semi-professional clubs from Britain and Ireland. The final was contest on 17 May 2013 and won by Leinster A with a 78th minute penalty by Noel Reid to beat Newcastle Falcons 18–17 at their home ground Kingston Park. The defending champions Munster A were eliminated in the semi–finals by the eventual winners and Bedford Blues was the other losing semi–finalists.

There has been four different winners and four different losing finalist of the competition. The format of the competition has been considerably revamped, with expansion to 32 teams playing each other home and away in the pool stages.  Previously, 24 teams played home or away in the pool stages. First round matches began on the weekend of 13/14 October 2012 and the final was held on 17 May 2013.

Teams
The allocation of teams was as follows:

 – 12 clubs from RFU Championship
 – 4 Irish provinces represented by 'A' teams
 – 4 top clubs from the Scottish Premiership
 – 12 clubs from the Welsh Premier Division

Competition format 
The pool stage saw a considerable change in format and consisted of eight pools of four teams playing home and away matches.  Pool matches took place on the same weekends as the Heineken and Amlin Cups. The top team from each pool qualified for the quarter-finals.

Pool stages 
The fixture weekends have been announced.

Round 6 matches were badly affected by adverse weather.  Pitches were frozen or snow-covered, or teams were unable to travel.

Pool 1 

 This match was postponed from 20 January 2013 as the pitch was deemed frozen and the surrounding areas unsafe for supporters.

 Match postponed from 19 January 2013 as Ulster were unable to fly due to the bad weather.  Despite this match being a dead rubber (the outcome of this game will have no bearing on qualification for the knockout stages nor on the ranking of the qualifiers), the match was rearranged as Bridgend would lose revenue otherwise.

Pool 2 

 This match was originally scheduled to be played on 19 January 2013.  Due to bad weather, the Bedwas team was unable to travel to Bedford.

Pool 3

Pool 4 

 This match was postponed as the Newport team were unable to fly out of Bristol on 18 January due to snow  

 This match was originally scheduled to be played on 19 January 2013 but was postponed due to heavy snow. The match was a dead rubber and the outcome had no bearing on qualification for the knockout stages nor on the ranking of the qualifiers.

Pool 5 

 This fixture was moved to South Leeds Stadium as the RFU Championship game against Plymouth (on 6 January 2013) went to uncontested scrums within 16 minutes on the new pitch at Headingley. Subsequently, the match was moved to West Park Leeds RUFC as the pitch at South Leeds Stadium was uncovered and frozen. Finally, the game went ahead on the 3G pitch.

 This match, originally scheduled for 19 January, was postponed due to the ground being under a seven to nine inch layer of snow and unplayable.  Despite this match being a dead rubber (the outcome of this game will have no bearing on qualification for the knockout stages nor on the ranking of the qualifiers), the match was rearranged.

Pool 6

Pool 7 

 This match was postponed from 19 January 2013 due to a frozen pitch.  Although this match is a dead rubber (the outcome of this game will have no bearing on qualification for the knockout stages nor on the ranking of the qualifiers), a new date was arranged.

Pool 8 

 This match was postponed from 19 January after a pitch inspection deemed it unfit.

Knock–out stages

Qualifiers
The eight pool winners proceed to the knock out stages.  The quarter-final matches were:
Seed 1 v Seed 8
Seed 2 v Seed 7
Seed 3 v Seed 6
Seed 4 v Seed 5
Teams are ranked by
1. Competition Points (4 for a win, 2 for a draw, etc)
2. where Competition Points are equal, greatest number of wins
3. where these are equal, aggregate points difference
4. where these are equal, greatest number of points scored
There are further criteria that can be applied if necessary.

Quarter-finals

Semi-finals

Final

Top scorers

Top points scorers

Top try scorers

Geography

Notes

Notes

References

External links 
  Unofficial British and Irish Cup website - latest news, teams etc

British and Irish Cup
2012–13 rugby union tournaments for clubs
2012–13 RFU Championship
2012–13 in Irish rugby union
2012–13 in Welsh rugby union
2012–13 in Scottish rugby union
2012–13 in British rugby union